The Mid Canterbury Rugby Football Union (MCRFU) is a rugby province in the South Island of New Zealand.

History

The Mid Canterbury Rugby Football Union was formed in 1904 as Ashburton Country, first as a sub-union of the South Canterbury Rugby Football Union and then of the Canterbury Rugby Football Union. The union gained full status in 1927, and changed its name to Mid Canterbury in 1952.

Representative Rugby
The Mid Canterbury team play from Ashburton Showgrounds, Ashburton and in the 2006 season are in Pool B of the Heartland Championship. They are seeded 9th for the Championship as they finished 5th in the 3rd division in 2005.

Clubs
Mid Canterbury Rugby Football Union is made up of 9 clubs: 
 Allenton
 Celtic 
 Collegiate
 Hampstead
 Methven
 Mt Somers
 Rakaia
 Southern
 Tinwald

Mid Canterbury in Super Rugby

Mid Canterbury along with Canterbury, Tasman, Buller, South Canterbury and West Coast make up the Crusaders Super Rugby franchise.

Championships
Mid Canterbury won the 2nd division South Island in 1980, 1983 and the 3rd division in 1994 and 1998, and the Meads Cup in 2013 and 2014.

Heartland Championship placings

Ranfurly Shield
Mid Canterbury have never held the Ranfurly Shield. Mid Canterbury last challenged for the Shield in July 2015 against Hawke's Bay, but were defeated 57–12.

Hanan Shield 
The Hanan Shield is one of the most prestigious trophy in New Zealand's domestic rugby union competition. First played for in 1946, the Hanan Shield is based on a challenge system played between North Otago, South Canterbury and Mid Canterbury.

All Blacks
There have only been 3 players selected for the All Blacks whilst playing their club rugby in Mid Canterbury.

 D.H Cameron
 R.G Perry
 J.C Ross

References

External links
 Official Site

New Zealand rugby union teams
New Zealand rugby union governing bodies
Sports organizations established in 1904